Salix petiolaris, common name slender willow or meadow willow, is a species of willow.

Conservation status in the United States
It is listed as a species of special concern in Connecticut by state authorities. It is also listed as threatened in Ohio, and endangered in Pennsylvania.

References

External links
 
 

Flora of North America
petiolaris